Risman is a surname and may refer to:

Barbara Risman, American sociologist
Bev Risman (born 1937), former English rugby union and rugby league footballer
Gus Risman (1911–1994), Welsh rugby league footballer
John Risman, President of Scotland Rugby League and a professional rugby league footballer
Matthew Risman, a fictional character in the Marvel Universe